Tahani Alqahtani (born 3 August 1999) is a Saudi Arabian international level judoka.

She qualified for the 2020 Summer Olympics. She participated at the 2021 World Judo Championships. She was eliminated from 2020 Olympics after losing to Israeli counterpart Raz Hershko. The match gained notability for Tahani agreeing to compete against an Israeli athlete, which was never done before in the history of Saudi Arabia's Olympics participation despite boycott pressure.

References

External links 
 

1999 births
Living people
Sportspeople from Riyadh
Saudi Arabian female judoka
Judoka at the 2020 Summer Olympics
Olympic judoka of Saudi Arabia
20th-century Saudi Arabian women
21st-century Saudi Arabian women